Sixgill is an Israeli B2B cyber intelligence company that analyses and monitors the deep web and dark web for threat intelligence. The company was founded in 2014 and is headquartered in Tel Aviv, Israel.

History 
Sixgill was founded in Tel Aviv, Israel, in 2014, by Avi Kasztan and Elad Lavi. The idea for Sixgill was developed by Kasztan. Soon after the company was established, it joined the Citibank accelerator program.

The Sixgill platform uses proprietary algorithms and technology to create profiles and patterns of dark web users and hidden social networks. It identifies and tracks potential cyber criminals to prevent malicious activity such as hacking and data breaches. Customers of Sixgill include; global 2000 enterprises, financial services, managed security service providers (MSSPs), government and law enforcement agencies.

In 2017, Sixgill was responsible for tracking ISIS cyber activity in relation to threats made towards Prince George and the British royal family. In 2019, Sixgill agents uncovered the money laundering activities undertaken by cyber criminals through the Fortnite Battle Royale online game in Russian, Chinese, Arabic, English and Spanish.

Sixgill offers autonomous threat intelligence solutions to help organizations detect and protect against phishing, data leaks, fraud, malware and vulnerability exploitation in order to enhance cyber resilience and minimize risk exposure in real-time. The Investigative Portal provides covert access to threat intel from the deep and dark web, with context and actionable insights for remediation. Integrated into existing security systems, Darkfeed™ improves endpoint protection by preemptively blocking malicious IOCs, while CVE insights from the DVE Score™ transform vulnerability management, predicting the immediate risk of vulnerability exploitation based on threat actor intent.

Investments 
In 2014, Sixgill received its initial funding of US$1 million from Terra Labs. In 2016, the company raised an additional series A round of $4.3 million composed of $800,000 from Terra Labs and $3.5 million from Elron Electronic Industries.

Awards and recognition 

 2019 - Cool Vendor in Security Operations Threat Intelligence, by Gartner Inc.

References

External links 
 

Security software
Software companies of Israel
Technology companies of Israel